= Sternewirth Privilege =

The Sternewirth Privilege is a tradition in breweries where brewery workers and visitors are given access to free beer from the brewery taproom (The Sternewirth) when they feel thirsty.
